Soundtrack for a Revolution is a 2009 documentary film written and directed by Bill Guttentag and Dan Sturman. This documentary traces the story of the Civil Rights Movement and the struggles fought by young African-American activists with an emphasis on the power of music.  Soundtrack for a Revolution had its international premiere at the Cannes Film Festival and its North American premiere at the Tribeca Film Festival. Soundtrack for a Revolution was selected by the Academy of Motion Picture Arts and Sciences as part of the Oscar shortlist for the Documentary Feature category of the 82nd Academy Awards. Guttentag and Sturman were nominated for Best Documentary Screenplay from the Writers Guild of America. The film has screened at numerous festivals including Cannes, Tribeca, IDFA and Sheffield Doc/Fest.

Music
Guttentag and Sturman had contemporary artists interpret the music and the messages of the Civil Rights Movement including Wyclef Jean, John Legend, Joss Stone and The Roots. John Legend sang "Woke Up This Morning", Richie Havens sang "Will the Circle be Unbroken", The Roots sang "Ain't Gonna Let Nobody Turn Me Around", Joss Stone sang "Keep Your Eyes on the Prize" and Wyclef Jean sang "Here's to the State of Mississippi" by Phil Ochs.

Cast
The Roots - Themselves (performers)
John Legend - Himself (performer)
Wyclef Jean - Himself (performer)
Joss Stone - Herself (performer)
Richie Havens - Himself (performer)
Anthony Hamilton - Himself (performer)
The Blind Boys of Alabama - Themselves (performers)
Angie Stone - Herself (performer)
Mary Mary - Themselves (performers)
TV On The Radio - Themselves (performers)
Harry Belafonte - Himself (interviewee)
John Lewis - Himself (interviewee)
Lula Joe Willams - Herself (interviewee)
Andrew Young - Himself (interviewee)
Lynda Lowery - Herself (interviewee)

See also
 Civil rights movement in popular culture

References

Further reading

External links
 
 Soundtrack for a Revolution at Rotten Tomatoes

2009 films
American Experience
French documentary films
British documentary films
Documentary films about the civil rights movement
Documentary films about African Americans
Documentary films about music and musicians
2009 documentary films
2000s English-language films
2000s American films
2000s British films
2000s French films